Dudhapur  is a village near Bahjoi in Bhimnagar district of Uttar Pradesh state of India.

References

Villages in Sambhal district